Johannes Clausen Bjerg (26 January 1886 – 17 February 1955) was a Danish sculptor who worked primarily in the El Greco-style.

Early life
Born in Ødis near Kolding, Bjerg attended the Latin School in Kolding before serving an apprenticeship with A.L. Johansen & Son in 1907 during which he created an oak bust of his father. Thereafter he spent an extended period in Copenhagen (1908–11) during which he created a silver medal for a bronze bust of his father.   In 1911, he went to Paris  to associate with progressive artists of the times such as Picasso, leading to his Cubic bronze bust of the Finnish sculptor Bertil Nilsson (1912).

Career
While in Paris, Bjerg became a member of Section d'Or association, in which  Auguste Agero (1880–1945) became a source of Cubic inspiration. With the outbreak of the First World War he returned to Denmark, where he crafted Abessinieren (1915), followed by  Den svangre (1918), Elskovskampen (1922) and Danaide (1923), of which copies were installed in Copenhagen, Aarhus and Odensen. He later created monuments and statues of other figures which were installed in many Danish towns and cities. From the mid-1920s, he became Denmark's most prominent sculptor creating numerous official monuments in the traditional Danish Neoclassical style.

From 1922, Bjerg was a member of Den Frie Udstilling. In 1945, he became a professor at the Royal Danish Academy of Fine Arts where he was director from 1943 to 1946.

Awards
Bjerg was awarded the Thorvaldsen Medal in 1944.

References

Literature

External links
Johannes Bjerg

1886 births
1955 deaths
People from Kolding Municipality
Recipients of the Thorvaldsen Medal
Academic staff of the Royal Danish Academy of Fine Arts
20th-century Danish sculptors
Male sculptors
20th-century Danish male artists
Burials at the Garrison Cemetery, Copenhagen